In the United States, the lower class are those at or near the lower end of the socio-economic hierarchy. As with all social classes in the United States, the lower class is loosely defined and its boundaries and definitions subject to debate and ambiguous popular opinions. Sociologists such as W. Lloyd Warner, Dennis Gilbert and James Henslin divide the lower classes into two. The contemporary division used by Gilbert divides the lower class into the working poor and underclass. Service and low-rung manual laborers are commonly identified as being among the working poor. Those who do not participate in the labor force and rely on public assistance as their main source of income are commonly identified as members of the underclass. Overall the term describes those in easily filled employment positions with little prestige or economic compensation who often lack a high school education and are to some extent disenfranchised from mainstream society.

Estimates for how many households are members of this class vary with definition. According to Dennis Gilbert roughly one quarter, 25%, of US households were in the lower classes; 13% were members among the working poor while 12% were members of the underclass. While many in the lower working class are employed in service jobs, lack of participation in the labor force remains the main cause for the economic plight experienced by those in the lower classes. In 2005, the majority of households (56%) in the bottom income quintile had no income earners while 65% of householders did not work. This contrasts starkly to households in the top quintile, 76% of whom had two or more income earners.

Lacking educational attainment as well as disabilities are among the main causes for the infrequent employment. Many households rise above or fall below the poverty threshold, depending on the employment status of household members. While only about 12% of households fall below the poverty threshold at one point in time, the percentage of those who fall below the poverty line at any one point throughout a year is much higher. Working class as well as working poor households may fall below the poverty line if an income earner becomes unemployed. In any given year roughly one out of every five (20%) households falls below the poverty line at some point while up to 40% may fall into poverty within the course of a decade.

See also
Affluence in the United States
American middle class
Household income in the United States
Personal income in the United States
Poorest places in the United States
Poverty and health in the United States
Poverty in the United States
Social class in American history
Social class in the United States
Wealth inequality in the United States

References

External links
US Census Bureau's official online income statistics forum
Income distribution and income by race, US Census Bureau 2005
Household income by educational attainment, US Census Bureau
Personal income in 2004, US Census Bureau
Median Family Income by Family Size (in 2004 inflation-adjusted dollars) from Census.gov
Median Family Income by Number of Earners in Family (in 2004 inflation-adjusted dollars) from Census.gov
Working Definitions ClassMatters.com
How Class Works, The New York Times

Social class in the United States
Poverty in the United States